A web desktop or webtop is a desktop environment embedded in a web browser or similar client application. A webtop integrates web applications, web services, client–server applications, application servers, and applications on the local client into a desktop environment using the desktop metaphor. Web desktops provide an environment similar to that of Windows, Mac, or a graphical user interface on Unix and Linux systems. It is a virtual desktop running in a web browser. In a webtop the applications, data, files, configuration, settings, and access privileges reside remotely over the network. Much of the computing takes place remotely. The browser is primarily used for display and input purposes.

The terms "web desktop" and "webtop" are distinct from web operating system, a network operating system such as TinyOS or distributed operating system such as Inferno. In popular use, web desktops are sometimes referred to incorrectly as web operating systems or simply WebOS.

History 

In the context of a web desktop, the term Webtop was first introduced by the Santa Cruz Operation (SCO) in 1994 for a web-based interface to their Unix operating system. This application was based on the provisional application entitled "The Adaptive Internet Protocol System" filed Nov. 13, 1997, serial number 60/065,521 and is the U.S. patent for the technology used in the Tarantella Webtop. Andy Bovingdon  and Ronald Joe Record, who both explored the concepts in different directions, are often credited as the inventors. The initial SCO Webtop, developed by Record, utilized a Netscape Navigator plugin to display applications in a browser window via TightVNC. A trademark application for "SCO Webtop" was filed with the U.S. Patent and Trademark Office on November 8, 1996. In order to avoid confusion with the more complex technology incorporated into the Tarantella Webtop it was abandoned on December 24, 1997 by The Santa Cruz Operation.

Bovingdon's three tiered architecture (TTA) concept was launched as the Tarantella Webtop. This technology originated from early commercial use of web server technology by SCO. the first OS vendor to include a commercial web server, NCSA HTTPd, and commercial web browser, NCSA Mosaic. Their X.desktop product line, obtained when they acquired IXI Limited in the UK, was the first to have icons for URLs (controlled via the Deskshell scripting language) and an HTML-based help system, called DeskHelp, which extended the NCSA Mosaic web browser to include APIs and scripting linked to the X.desktop product for interactive control. The IXI Limited scripting language based on Python was later replaced with JavaScript. Tarantella allowed real UNIX and Windows applications to be displayed within a web browser through the use of Java to form a true web based desktop or Webtop.

The first SCO Webtop releases were part of SCO Skunkware before being integrated into SCO OpenServer version 5 and UnixWare 7. Tarantella was subsequently purchased by Sun Microsystems and integrated into their Sun Secure Global Desktop.

Byte magazine referred to the Webtop as a NUI (Network User Interface).

More recently, Google released an operating system for web connection called ChromeOS and several 11-12" netbooks from Acer and Samsung have implemented the system. It is thought to represent a useful fraction (~10%) of the current (2012) netbook sales.

Advantages 

 Convenience A personalized desktop on every supported client device
 Mobility Access your desktop anywhere there is a supported client device
 Session management Server-side session management allows roaming users to access restored sessions from anywhere
 Software management
 Ensures all users are running the same current versions of all applications
 Updates and patches need only be applied to the server - no need to update multiple clients
 No need for software to distribute software over the network
 Security
 Less prone to typical attacks, viruses, worms, unpatched clients, vulnerabilities
 Sensitive data stored on secure servers rather than scattered across multiple potentially unprotected and vulnerable clients (e.g. smart phones and laptops)
 Encrypted transmission of all data between server and clients (e.g. https)
 Software Management features (above) accommodate quick and easy application of security advisories on server side
 Webtop administrator can control which applications and data each user is allowed to access
 High availability
 From a single device access Windows, UNIX, Linux, and Mainframe applications, all at the same time
 Minimal hardware requirements for client devices (except for rendered technologies such as Flash/Flex/SilverLight)
 Less downtime - robust server system more easily protected and less likely to fail than multiple client desktops
 Fault tolerance - if a client device fails for any reason simply replace it with any other supported client device without loss of data, configuration, preferences, or application access

Drawbacks 

 Security Because all data is transferred over the internet, it might be possible for a cracker to intercept the connection and read data. Although with the use of https 256-bit encryption and access control lists, this can be safe-guarded.
 Speed When using a web desktop the whole code used for visualization (.js/.css files, Flash player files, etc.) needs to be transferred to the local computer, so that it can be displayed. Further, network latency or congestion can intermittently slow webtop activity. Offline application storage can mitigate this issue.
 Application features Some webtop-delivered applications may not contain the full feature set of their traditional desktop counterparts.
 Network Access Web desktops require access to a network. If the client device is misconfigured or the network is unreachable then the web desktop is unavailable.
 Controlled access In some webtop implementations and deployments a user's access to some applications and data can be restricted. This is also considered an advantage of webtops but can be viewed as a drawback from the user's perspective.
 Central control The normal webtop user is not able to install additional applications or update existing applications. Updates typically must be performed by an administrator on the server side. Webtop users are dependent upon the webtop administrator whereas in the traditional desktop environment the user can fix and/or break the system by installing new software or updates. This can also be seen as an advantage for webtops.

Comparison of web desktops 

The following tables compare general and technical information for a number of web desktops.

See also 

 Comparison of remote desktop software
 Hosted desktop
 Online office suite
 Rich Internet application
 Virtual Network Computing

Notes

References 

 SCO Tarantella Offers New Twist On an Old Thin-Client Dance, "Network Computing Magazine", Mark Andrew Seltzer, January 24, 2000
 Ditch That Desktop for a Webtop, PC World, October 16, 2000
 SCO Company History, Operating System Documentation Project
  SCO revamps UnixWare with Linux features, CNET News.com, February 23, 1999
 SCO Showcases Latest In Network Computing for Real-World Environments, Network Computing News, April 29, 1997

Desktop environments